Advances in Neonatal Care is a bimonthly peer-reviewed healthcare journal of neonatal nursing. It is the official journal of the National Association of Neonatal Nurses.

See also
 Journal of Obstetric, Gynecologic, & Neonatal Nursing
 Neonatal Network: The Journal of Neonatal Nursing
 List of nursing journals

External links

National Association of Neonatal Nurses

Pediatric nursing journals
Monthly journals
Lippincott Williams & Wilkins academic journals
English-language journals
Publications established in 2001